The year 1979 in architecture involved some significant architectural events and new buildings.

Buildings and structures

Buildings opened
March – Kuwait Towers opens in Kuwait City with a Viewing Sphere which completes a full turn every 30 minutes.
September 2 – Prabhupada's Palace of Gold is dedicated in Marshall County, West Virginia, USA, as a memorial shrine built by Hare Krishna devotees.
September 3 – National Theater of Cuba, Havana; construction of the building began in 1951.
October 10 – The Atheneum, designed by Richard Meier, opens as a visitor center in New Harmony, Indiana.

Buildings completed

Brønnøysund Bridge, Norway.
Parque Central Complex, Caracas, Venezuela, the tallest building in South America.
The Tower of Europe in Frankfurt am Main, Germany.
Vienna International Centre, for the United Nations Office at Vienna.
Rio de Janeiro Cathedral (Catedral Metropolitana do Rio de Janeiro), with 64 meter (210 ft) tall stained glass windows.
Hedmark Museum, Hamar, Norway, designed by Sverre Fehn.
Bauhaus Archive, West Berlin, Germany, designed by Alexander Cvijanović with Hans Bandel after Walter Gropius.
"Stars" housing estate, Katowice, Poland.

Events
 December: The Thirties Society (now the Twentieth Century Society) established in the United Kingdom as an architectural conservation pressure group.
 Pritzker Prize instituted by Jay A. Pritzker.
 Construction begins at the Jacob K. Javits Convention Center designed by I. M. Pei.
 Xanadu House design started.
 Construction of the 360 foot (110 m) communications mast atop the North Tower (1WTC) of the World Trade Center is completed.

Awards
American Academy of Arts and Letters Gold Medal – I. M. Pei.
AIA Gold Medal – I. M. Pei.
Architecture Firm Award – Geddes Brecher Qualls Cunningham.
Grand prix national de l'architecture – Claude Parent.
Pritzker Prize – Philip Johnson.
RAIA Gold Medal – Bryce Mortlock.
RIBA Royal Gold Medal – Charles and Ray Eames.
Twenty-five Year Award – Yale University Art Gallery.

Deaths
July 13 – Juraj Neidhardt, Croatian architect, teacher, urban planner and writer (born 1899)
October 11 – Roger Hayward, US artist, architect, optical designer and astronomer (born 1899)
December 8 – Sydney Ancher, Australian architect (born 1904)
December 31 – Charles Draper Faulkner, Chicago-based architect (born 1890)

References

 
20th-century architecture